Brumano is a comune (municipality) in the Province of Bergamo in the Italian region of Lombardy, located about  northeast of Milan and about  northwest of Bergamo.

Brumano borders the following municipalities: Erve, Fuipiano Valle Imagna, Lecco, Locatello, Morterone, Rota d'Imagna, Valsecca, Vedeseta.

Demographic evolution

Twin towns – sister cities
Brumano is twinned with:

  Morterone, Italy (2007)

References